David Edwardes Davies (30 May 1879 – 15 May 1950) was the Anglican Bishop of Bangor from 1944 to 1949.

Edwardes Davies was educated at Durham University on a theological scholarship and ordained in 1905. He began his ordained ministry with curacies at Oswestry and Wrexham. He then held incumbencies at Brymbo, Mold, Rhyl and Swansea before his ordination to the episcopate. He died on 15 May 1950.

References

1879 births
Alumni of Hatfield College, Durham
Bishops of Bangor
20th-century bishops of the Church in Wales
1950 deaths